Ammophila arenaria is a species of grass in the family Poaceae. It is known by the common names marram grass and European beachgrass. It is one of two species of the genus Ammophila. It is native to the coastlines of Europe and North Africa where it grows in the sands of beach dunes. It grows from a network of thick rhizomes which give it a sturdy anchor in its sand substrate and allow it to spread upward as sand accumulates. One clump can produce 100 new shoots annually.

The rhizomes tolerate submersion in sea water and can break off and float in the currents to establish the grass at new sites. It is adapted to habitat made up of shifting, accreting sand layers, as well as that composed of stabilised dunes.

Life cycle/phenology

Ammophila arenaria is a perennial plant, which means it can live for many years. It mainly grows in spring when leaf production exceeds leaf senescence. However, the conditions in autumn cause the plant to nearly stop growth while its leaves become aged. In winter, because of the cold temperatures, growth is very slow but does not stop.
As a xerophytic adaptation, its leaves curl during drought (see pictures). The relatively high humidity within the curled leaf prevents a rapid water loss. This is facilitated by the bulliform cells located at the base of the V-shaped notch which swells and makes the leaf uncurl when filled with water.

This plant is highly adaptive in sand, and can withstand burial for more than one year. Unlike other plants which will die in sand, marram grass will elongate its leaves when it is buried by sand.

Its inflorescences are initiated in autumn of the second year after germination and mature in May or June, and its flowers are always produced from May to August. But this is changed to May in Europe because of the different climates. The fruit is always mature in September, and the seeds germinate in the next spring. Though the adult plant is strong, the seeds have low viability, and the seedlings also have low survival rates as well because of desiccation, burial, and erosion. The main organ for its reproduction is rhizomes, which are dispersed along the shore by wind and water.

Geographic distribution and habitat

Natural global range 
Ammophila arenaria is a European and North African native plant. It occurs in Australia, Canada, Chile, Falkland Islands (Malvinas) (sub-Antarctic), New Zealand, South Africa and United States (USA).

New Zealand range 
Usually occurs on sand dunes, sometimes in inland sites with low fertility. It occurs in the Wellington region and extends from to 55 to 32 degrees south latitude. In the Northern Hemisphere, it grows between 30 and 63 degrees north latitude. Occurs in Chatham Islands, Otago Region, Doughboy Bay and Mason Bay.

Habitat preferences 
Marram grass grows on coastal sand dunes all over the world. It prefers growing on the active sand area and the windward side of the foredune. It prefers well-drained soils with different kinds of mineral compositions and low in organic matter. Marram grass can also be found on alkaline soils with a high pH of around 9.1 and also acidic soils with pH less than 4.5. Adult plants can tolerate a large range of chemical issues. Marram grass has an ability to adapt dry sand well. Its leaves become rolled and tight when moisture levels are low.

Invasiveness: Pacific coast of North America
A. arenaria is one of the most problematic noxious weeds of coastal California. This sand-adapted grass was introduced to the beaches of western North America during the mid-19th century to provide stabilization to shifting sand dunes. It grew readily and it can now be found from California to British Columbia. The grass is invasive in the local ecosystems, forming dense monotypic stands that crowd out native vegetation, reduce species diversity of native arthropods, and cover vital open stretches of sand used for nesting by the threatened western snowy plover (Charadrius nivosus). The plant's spread has changed the topography of some California beach ecosystems, especially in sand dunes. The presence of this grass was a major cause of the destruction of native dune habitat in Oregon and Washington during the 20th century, where it was planted precisely for its dune-stabilizing effect.

Several methods have been employed in attempts to eradicate the grass in California, including manual pulling, burning, mechanical removal followed by salt water irrigation, and glyphosate application. Studies to find the best methods are ongoing.

The California Conservation Corps also has taken a major effort in the removal of the invasive Beachgrass.

Invasiveness: New Zealand and Australia 
Not only is it invasive in California, it is also a highly invasive weed in coastal areas of New Zealand and Western Australia, where it was introduced for the same purpose in California, to stabilise dunes; outcompeting native spinifex species. However in New Zealand the larvae of the endemic moth species Agrotis innominata has adapted to using A. arenaria as one of its main host species. It has been suggested that prior to the removal of this invasive grass from the coasts of New Zealand that surveys be undertaken to establish whether this endemic moth is present in order to assist with the conservation of that species.

Predators, parasites, and diseases
Marram grass does not carry any major disease in New Zealand, as only 3 pathogenic fungi (Claviceps purpurea, Uredo sp. and Colletotrichum graminicola) are present on the island. These three fungi result in ergot, rust and leaf spot respectively and are found both on flower-heads and leaves. However, in European countries, there are a lot of pests known to feed on marram grass. Those pests killed 30%-40% of the tillers, and also damaged other species. The fungi, always found in soil, may decrease the vigour on the stabilized sand.

Uses
The roots of marram grass are edible, although rather thin and fibrous. The flowering stems and leaves are used for thatching, basketry and making brooms. Fiber from the stem is used for making paper, and the rhizomes are used for making rope and mats.

See also
Sea balls

References

External links

Ammophila arenaria - U.C. Photo gallery
Jepson Manual Treatment - Ammophila arenaria (invasive species)
USDA Plants Profile
New Zealand website: Plant details - Marram grass - discussing control of Ammophila arenaria.

Pooideae
Grasses of Europe
Flora of North Africa
Plants described in 1753
Taxa named by Carl Linnaeus